Vuokko Aulikki Oksanen-Halonen (born 19 July 1944, in Karvia) is a Finnish writer. She was awarded the Runeberg Prize in 1991, and the Pro Finlandia medal in 2020.

References 

1944 births
Living people
Finnish writers